The Washington Nationals are an American professional baseball team based in Washington, D.C. They compete in Major League Baseball (MLB) as a member of the National League (NL) East division. From 2005 to 2007, the team played in RFK Stadium while a new stadium was being built. In 2008, they moved in to Nationals Park, located on South Capitol Street in the Navy Yard neighborhood  of the Southeast quadrant of D.C., near the Anacostia River.

The Nationals are the eighth major league franchise to be based in  Washington, D.C., and the first since 1971. The current franchise was founded in 1969 as the Montreal Expos as part of a four-team expansion. After a failed contraction plan, the Expos were purchased by MLB, which sought to move the team to a new city. Washington, D.C. was chosen in 2004, and the Nationals were established in 2005 as the first MLB franchise move since the third Washington Senators moved to Texas in 1971.

While the team initially struggled after moving to Washington, the Nationals had considerable success throughout the 2010s. The team had two back-to-back first overall picks in the MLB draft in 2009 and 2010, where they drafted Stephen Strasburg and Bryce Harper. The team secured their first playoff berth and first division title in 2012. They won the National League East again in 2014, 2016, and 2017, but failed to advance past the NLDS each time. In 2019, the team advanced to the World Series and defeated the Houston Astros in seven games to earn their first championship.

As of the start of the 2023 season, the franchise's overall win–loss record is 4,123–4,387. Since moving to Washington, D.C., their overall win–loss record is 1,368–1,444

History

Early baseball in Washington, D.C.

Multiple short-lived baseball franchises, including two named the Nationals, played in Washington with the National Association in the 1870s. The first Washington Nationals team in a major league played in the American Association in 1884. Another Washington Nationals team also played in the Union Association during its only season in 1884. The first Washington Nationals of the National League played from 1886 to 1889.

Washington Senators / Statesmen / Nationals

The Washington Statesmen played in the American Association in 1891, before jumping to the National League as the Senators the following season. The Washington Senators, who were often referred to as the Nationals, played in the National League from 1892 to 1899. They were followed in 1901 by another Washington Senators franchise — a charter member of the new American League — who were officially named the Washington Nationals from 1905 to 1955. In 1912, another Washington Senators team formed as one of eight teams of the United States Baseball League. But the league and the team folded after just over a month of play in 1912.

The first American League Senators franchise moved to Minneapolis after the 1960 season and became the Minnesota Twins. They were replaced in Washington by an expansion team, the second American League Senators franchise, which began play in 1961 and moved to Arlington, Texas, after the 1971 season to become the Texas Rangers.

Montreal Expos

The Montreal Expos were part of the 1969 Major League Baseball expansion, which included the Seattle Pilots (now the Milwaukee Brewers), Kansas City Royals, and San Diego Padres. Based in Montreal, the Expos were the first Major League team in Canada. They were named after the Expo 67 World's Fair.

The majority-share owner was Charles Bronfman, a major shareholder in Seagram. The Expos' initial home was Jarry Park. Managed by Gene Mauch, the team lost 110 games in their first season, coincidentally matching the Padres' inaugural win–loss record, and continued to struggle during their first decade with sub-.500 seasons.

Starting in 1977, the team's home venue was Montreal's Olympic Stadium, built for the 1976 Summer Olympics. Two years later, the team won a franchise-high 95 games, finishing second in the National League East. The Expos began the 1980s with a core group of young players, including catcher Gary Carter, outfielders Tim Raines and Andre Dawson, third baseman Tim Wallach, and pitchers Steve Rogers and Bill Gullickson. The team won its only division championship in the strike-shortened split season of 1981, ending its season with a three-games-to-two loss to the Los Angeles Dodgers in the National League Championship Series.

The team spent most of the 1980s in the middle of the NL East pack, finishing in third or fourth place in eight out of nine seasons from 1982 to 1990. Buck Rodgers was hired as manager before the 1985 season and guided the Expos to a .500 or better record five times in six years, with the highlight coming in 1987, when they won 91 games. They finished third, but were just four games behind the division-winning Cardinals.

Bronfman sold the team to a consortium of owners in 1991, with Claude Brochu as the managing general partner. Rodgers, at that time second only to Gene Mauch in number of Expos games managed, was replaced partway through the 1991 season. In May 1992, Felipe Alou, a member of the Expos organization since 1976, was promoted to manager, becoming the first Dominican-born manager in MLB history. Alou would become the leader in Expos games managed, while guiding the team to winning records, including 1994, when the Expos, led by a talented group of players including Larry Walker, Moisés Alou, Marquis Grissom and Pedro Martínez, had the best record in the major leagues until the 1994–95 Major League Baseball strike forced the cancellation of the remainder of the season. After the disappointment of 1994, Expos management began shedding its key players, and the team's fan support dwindled.

Brochu sold control of the team to Jeffrey Loria in 1999, but Loria failed to close on a plan to build a new downtown ballpark, and did not reach an agreement on television and English radio broadcast contracts for the 2000 season, reducing the team's media coverage.

Proposed 2001 contraction

After the 2001 season, MLB considered revoking the team's franchise, along with either the Minnesota Twins or the Tampa Bay Devil Rays.  In November 2001, Major League Baseball's owners voted 28–2 to contract the league by two teams — according to various sources, the Expos and the Minnesota Twins, both of which reportedly voted against contraction. Subsequently, the Boston Red Sox were sold to a partnership led by John W. Henry, owner of the Florida Marlins. In order to clear the way for Henry's group to assume ownership of the Red Sox, Henry sold the Marlins to Loria, and MLB purchased the Expos from Loria. However, the Metropolitan Sports Facilities Commission, operator of the Metrodome, won an injunction requiring the Twins to play there in 2002. Because MLB was unable to revoke the Twins franchise, it was compelled to keep both the Twins and Expos as part of the regular season schedule. In the collective bargaining agreement signed with the Major League Baseball Players Association (MLBPA) in August 2002, contraction was prohibited until the end of the contract in 2006. By that time, the Expos had become the Washington Nationals and the Twins had made sufficient progress towards the eventual building of a new baseball-specific stadium that contraction was no longer on the agenda.

2005 move
With contraction no longer an option for the immediate term, MLB began looking for a new site for the Expos. Some of the choices included: Oklahoma City; Washington, D.C.; San Juan, Puerto Rico; Monterrey, Mexico; Portland, Oregon; Northern Virginia (such as Arlington or Dulles); Norfolk, Virginia; Las Vegas; and Charlotte, North Carolina. Washington, D.C., and both Virginia locations emerged as the front-runners.

On September 29, 2004, MLB announced the Expos would move to Washington, D.C., in 2005. On November 15, a lawsuit by the former team owners against MLB and former majority owner Jeffrey Loria was struck down by arbitrators, bringing to an end all legal actions that would impede a move. The owners of the other MLB teams approved the move to Washington, D.C., in a 28–1 vote on December 3 (Baltimore Orioles owner Peter Angelos cast the sole dissenting vote).

Although there was some sentiment to revive the name Senators when the Montreal Expos franchise moved to Washington in 2005, legal and political considerations factored into the choice of Nationals, a revival of the first American League franchise's official name used from 1901 to 1956. Politicians and others in the District of Columbia objected to the name Senators because the District of Columbia does not have voting representation in Congress. In addition, the Rangers still owned the rights to the Senators name, although the Nationals were able to acquire the rights to the curly "W" logo from the Rangers. This logo closely resembles the Walgreens logo, but the drugstore chain has never sued.

Washington, D.C., mayor Anthony A. Williams supported the name "Washington Grays", in honor of the Negro-league team the Homestead Grays (1929–1950), which had been based in Pittsburgh, but played many of their home games in Washington. On November 21, 2004, the team's management chose the name "Washington Nationals". The club's official colors of red, white, and blue were revealed the next day.

As part of the move, the Nationals played their first three seasons at RFK Stadium until Nationals Park could be built. Nationals Park was completed in 2008, and the Nationals played their first home game there on March 30, 2008. The game was nationally televised on ESPN and former U.S. President George W. Bush threw out the first pitch. Ryan Zimmerman hit a walk-off home run to win the first game in the new stadium.

Inaugural 2005 season

The Nationals' first game was played on April 4, 2005, at Citizens Bank Park in South Philadelphia against the Philadelphia Phillies, and the Phillies won the game 8-4. The Nationals finished their 2005 inaugural season at .500 with an 81-81 record. Its first draft pick as the Nationals was Ryan Zimmerman, a Virginia native, in the first round of the 2005 draft. Zimmerman made his MLB debut in 2005 and became one of the teams best players and the face of the franchise, playing his entire career with the Nationals.

2000s and 2010s
When Ted Lerner took over the club in mid-2006, he hired Stan Kasten as team president. Kasten was widely known as the architect of the Atlanta Braves before and during their run of 14 division titles. Kasten was also the general manager or president of many other Atlanta-area sports teams, including the Atlanta Hawks and Atlanta Thrashers. "The Plan", as it became known, was a long-range rebuilding and restructuring of the team from the ground up. This plan included investing in the farm system and the draft, and having a suitable team to go along with their new stadium.

In the front office, the Nationals hired the well-respected former Arizona scouting director Mike Rizzo to be the vice president of baseball operations, second in charge under then-general manager Jim Bowden.

The Nationals finished in last place in four out of five years from 2006-2010, but began building the foundations of a contender with their first-overall draft picks of pitcher Stephen Strasburg (in 2009) and outfielder Bryce Harper (in 2010), as well as their sixth-overall draft pick of infielder Anthony Rendon (in 2011). Strasburg, arguably the most hyped prospect in baseball history, struck out 14 batters in an unprecedented Major League debut. In 2011, they signed Jayson Werth to the team's first big free agent contract.  With a mix of homegrown players and players acquired via trade and free agency, the Nationals clinched their first playoff berth and first division title in 2012. Teenage phenom Harper was named NL Rookie of the Year, the youngest ever to win. The Nationals were knocked out of the 2012 NLDS by the St. Louis Cardinals in five games after the Cardinals took the lead with two outs in the top of the ninth of game 5. After missing the playoffs in 2013, they hired Matt Williams as manager and rebounded to win their second division title in 2014, but were eliminated in the 2014 NLDS by the San Francisco Giants. In 2014, they acquired shortstop prospect Trea Turner in a trade with the San Diego Padres, with Turner eventually becoming a major part of the Nationals' core. In 2015, the Nationals signed top free agent pitcher Max Scherzer to a 7-year, $210 million contract. That year, Harper had one of the greatest offensive seasons in MLB history, becoming the youngest player to win the NL MVP unanimously.  However the Nationals missed the playoffs again, leading to Williams' firing. The team hired veteran manager Dusty Baker in 2016, and returned to the playoffs only to be eliminated by the Los Angeles Dodgers in the 2016 NLDS in five games. They won the NL East title in 2017, but were eliminated in the NLDS yet again after losing game 5 to the Chicago Cubs. Baker's contract was not renewed after the 2017 playoff loss, and the team hired Dave Martinez as their sixth manager in ten years.

In 2018, the All-Star Game was played at Nationals Park. 19-year-old phenom Juan Soto had an exceptional debut campaign, finishing 2nd in NL Rookie of the Year Voting. The Nationals failed to make the playoffs in 2018, finishing a disappointing second in a year they were expected to sail to the playoffs. After the 2018 season, superstar slugger Bryce Harper left the team via free agency, signing with the rival Philadelphia Phillies.

2019 World Series win

The Nationals began the 2019 season with a record of 19–31, with their projected chances of winning the World Series at that time being 1.5 percent. They then posted a 74–38 record over the remaining 112 games, finishing with an overall record of 93-69 and earning a spot in the 2019 National League Wild Card Game, which they won over the Milwaukee Brewers 4–3. In the NLDS, the Nationals defeated the Los Angeles Dodgers in five games, propelling them past the divisional round for the first time in franchise history. The Nationals then swept the St. Louis Cardinals in the NLCS, giving them their first NL pennant. The team then defeated the Houston Astros in game seven of the 2019 World Series, giving them their first World Series championship, with Strasburg being voted series MVP. The World Series was the first in MLB history that saw no team win a game at home, as the road team won all seven. The Nationals went a perfect 5-0 in elimination games during the playoffs, all of which were come-from-behind victories, the first team in MLB history to do so.

Post-World Series
Franchise cornerstone Anthony Rendon left in free agency for the Los Angeles Angels after the 2019 season. The Nationals struggled in 2020, when the coronavirus pandemic led to the season being shortened to 60 games; the team finished 26-34 and missed the playoffs. After another disappointing start to the 2021 season, in which the team was under .500 at the trade deadline, GM Mike Rizzo disassembled much of the team, trading ace pitcher Max Scherzer and superstar shortstop Trea Turner to the Dodgers, among many other trades of starting players in exchange for prospects, signifying the start of a rebuilding process. Ryan Zimmerman, the longtime face of the franchise who had been with the team since its inaugural 2005 season, announced his retirement after the 2021 season, marking the end of the first era of Nationals baseball. On August 2, 2022, the Nationals traded 23-year-old superstar Juan Soto to the San Diego Padres after he turned down a 15-year, $440 million contract extension offer, which would have constituted the richest contract in baseball history. In doing so, the Nationals lost its franchise icon and one of the last integral players from the 2019 championship team. The Nationals received one of the largest prospect hauls in any single trade in baseball history in return, with the front office hoping that the elite prospects would form the core of the next championship team. After trading Soto and others, the Nationals finished the 2022 season with the worst record in baseball at 55-107.

In 2022, The Washington Post reported that the Lerner family was exploring a restructuring of the team's ownership, including the possibility of selling the team outright. Ted Lerner died on February 13, 2023, from pneumonia complications; his son Mark became the public-facing principal owner in 2018, though Ted continued to retain his full interest in the team's decisions.

Uniforms

2005–2008: Original uniforms

The Nationals' original home uniforms contained the team name and numbers in red with gold bevels and navy trim, and were paired with the all-red "curly W" cap. The road uniforms contained the city name and numbers in navy with gold bevels and red trim, and were paired with the all-navy "curly W" cap. The front letters of both uniforms formed a distinct bridge-like shape. This set was joined the following season by a red alternate uniform, which featured the interlocking "DC" in white with gold bevels and navy trim, as well as numbers in navy with gold bevels and white trim. The red alternates were paired with the all-red "DC" cap.

The Nationals sported two different sleeve patches with this set. In their inaugural season, the patch featured gold accents, the full team name and two gold stars on the outer navy circle, and the interlocking "DC" on the inner red circle. The patch was tweaked the following season, eliminating the team name in favor of nine gold stars and relegating red to trim color.

2009–2010: Road uniform changes
For the 2009 season, the Nationals kept the same home uniform but unveiled a new road and red alternate uniform, along with a roundel-less "DC" sleeve patch. The road uniform now featured a script rendition of the city name in front minus the gold bevels, with the letters now rendered in red with navy and gold trim. The red alternate replaced the "DC" logo with the "curly W" logo, and numbers changed to white with gold bevels and navy trim.

2011–present: "Curly W" and script "Nationals" uniforms
The Nationals unveiled a new uniform set starting in 2011. Gold was eliminated and the emphasis was on the "curly W" logo, which was prominently featured on the home and red alternate uniforms. The road all-navy cap was retired in a favor of a navy cap with red brim, and a new red cap with navy brim was added in 2013 for home games with the red alternates. The sleeve patch was updated to feature the primary roundel logo. Piping was added to the "curly W" uniforms.

In 2018 the Nationals released a navy alternate uniform, featuring a script rendition of the team name in white with red trim along with red numbers. The following season, the navy uniform proved to be a good-luck charm for the Nationals, as they went 11–3 while wearing the uniforms en route to winning the World Series. In 2020, a white version was added, with the script version of the team name in navy with red trim. Initially, the Nationals unveiled a pair of white-paneled and red-brimmed alternate caps: one in navy with the United States Capitol dome superimposed over a white block "W", and another in red with a navy block "W" superimposed over the silhouette of a pitcher. Both designs paid homage to the original Washington Senators (now Minnesota Twins) and the expansion Washington Senators (now Texas Rangers). However, only the "Capitol W" cap was used, and the "pitcher W" cap was not utilized on the field at all and immediately retired.

For most of the 2020 season, the Nationals wore gold-accented versions of the new white uniforms in celebration of their World Series championship, along with all-red caps with the gold "curly W" logo. The script white alternates made their on-field debut on the final regular season home game September 27 against the New York Mets, and were paired with the "Capitol W" cap (the red "curly W" batting helmets were used with this uniform). The Nationals did not wear their home and red alternate "curly W" uniforms throughout that shortened season. In 2021, the white alternates were also paired with the primary red "curly W" cap, though the alternate Capitol cap was still used occasionally.

Starting in 2022, the white alternate uniform with the "Nationals" script became the primary home uniform.

Stars and Stripes alternates

In 2009, the Nationals unveiled a navy alternate uniform for games that fell during Independence Day week. The uniform featured the "interlocking DC" logo rendered in the Stars and Stripes motif, along with white/red piping and white numbers with gold bevels and red trim. The original primary logo was added to the left sleeve, and a navy cap with red brim containing the aforementioned "DC flag" logo was used.

In 2011, the uniform was tweaked to feature the "curly W" in Stars and Stripes, along with updated logos and the removal of gold accents. The road navy cap was originally used with this uniform, but in 2016 it was replaced by a similar design, with the exception of the "curly W" which was now rendered in the Stars and Stripes. This design was used until 2019, during which the uniform was no longer exclusively worn on Independence Day week.

In 2017 a white version of the "Stars and Stripes" alternate was released; this one is paired with the navy-brimmed red cap featuring the "curly W" in Stars and Stripes.

City Connect uniform
As part of MLB's uniform deal with Nike, selected teams were given themed "City Connect" uniforms. The Nationals' version, unveiled in 2022, pay homage to the cherry blossoms that adorn Washington, D.C. in the spring. The design has a dark gray base with pink trim and printed cherry blossoms.

Season standings

Bold denotes a playoff season, pennant, or championship; italics denote an active season.

Postseason appearances

Players and personnel

Roster

Managers

Note: Updated through October 15, 2021.

Baseball Hall of Famers

Ford C. Frick Award

Retired numbers

During the franchise's period in Montreal, the Montreal Expos retired three numbers in honor of four players, plus Jackie Robinson's number 42 which was retired throughout all Major League Baseball in 1997. Following the move to Washington, D.C., the numbers (except 42) were returned to circulation and remain in use , although the "Team History" section of the Nationals' website continues to refer to the numbers as "retired." When Washington wore Expos throwback jerseys on July 6, 2019, catcher Yan Gomes wore his usual number 10, even though the number was retired by the Expos for Andre Dawson and Rusty Staub.

After the Expos' departure from Montreal, the National Hockey League′s Montreal Canadiens hung a banner in Bell Centre honoring the Expos' retired numbers.

The Nationals retired Ryan Zimmerman's No. 11 on June 18, 2022, the first number retired by the Nationals.

Ring of Honor
On August 10, 2010, the Nationals unveiled a "Ring of Honor" at Nationals Park to honor National Baseball Hall of Fame members who had played "significant years" for the Washington Nationals, original Washington Senators (1901–1960), expansion Washington Senators (1961–1971), Homestead Grays, or Montreal Expos. In late August 2016, the team dropped the criterion that an inductee be a member of the National Baseball Hall of Fame, also opening membership to "anyone who has made a significant contribution to the game of baseball in Washington, D.C."; the first inductee under the revised criteria was Frank Howard.

The Nationals′ attempt to honor the Montreal-Washington franchise's entire history in the Ring of Honor, as well as by tracking Montreal-Washington franchise records, is not without controversy; it has been criticized as "an embodiment of the team’s desire to find history before it can make much." Although Nationals fans generally take little interest in the franchise's Montreal years, some do appreciate acknowledging that the franchise has a history that predates its arrival in Washington, and former Expo Tim Raines received a warm round of applause from fans at Nationals Park at his induction ceremony on August 28, 2017, even though he had never even visited Washington, D.C. before, and the closest baseball he played in the market was one game for Baltimore with his son at the end of 2001. Some Montreal Expos fans express appreciation that the Nationals are honoring the Expos, and Expos players inducted into the Ring of Honor have expressed gratitude that the Nationals chose to include them, especially with no MLB team in Montreal to honor their careers. However, few Nationals fans have taken an interest in franchise records, preferring to compare Nationals records with those of previous Washington MLB teams instead, and a segment of Nationals fans actively opposes the inclusion of Expos history into that of the Nationals, taking the view that the Montreal years are irrelevant to Washington and that the team made a complete break with its past and started anew when it arrived in Washington, inheriting the history of the two Washington Senators teams rather than that of the Expos. Similarly, Montreal Expos fans have taken little or no interest in the achievements of Nationals players, and some Expos fans strongly oppose the inclusion of former Expos in the Ring, taking the position that to do so is to co-opt the history of the Expos, which they say belongs solely in Montreal.

Observers also have noted that the admission of the first Nationals player to the Ring of Honor, Iván "Pudge" Rodríguez, although he was well-liked as a National, highlights another awkward aspect of the Ring of Honor's acceptance criteria, because Rodriguez's inclusion arose out of his admission to the National Baseball Hall of Fame based on his exploits for other teams, not out of anything he did during a 155-game, two-season stint with the Nationals at the end of his career in years in which the Nationals posted mediocre records. Nationals general manager Mike Rizzo responded that his inclusion had merit even based on his time with the Nationals, when he "taught us how to be a professional franchise."

In a ceremony held at Nationals Park between games of a doubleheader on the evening of September 8, 2018, the Nationals inducted former outfielder Jayson Werth, who played for the Nationals from 2011 through 2017, into the Ring of Honor. He became the first "true" National – the first person based specifically on his career as a National – inducted into the Ring of Honor.

The Ring of Honor includes:

Attendance

Source:

Spring training

The Nationals hold spring training in Florida, where they play their annual slate of Grapefruit League games. From 2005 through 2016, they held spring training at Space Coast Stadium in Viera, Florida, a facility that they inherited from the Expos. In 2017, the Nationals moved their spring training operations to The Ballpark of the Palm Beaches, a new facility they share with the Houston Astros in West Palm Beach, Florida; they played their first Grapefruit League game there on February 28, 2017. On February 16, 2018, it was renamed FITTEAM Ballpark of the Palm Beaches after the Nationals and Astros signed a 12-year deal for the naming rights to the stadium that day with FITTEAM, an event brand partnership and organic products firm located in Palm Beach Gardens, Florida.

Minor league affiliations

The Nationals began an affiliation with the Low-A Nationals in 2005; the then-Advanced-A Potomac Nationals moved from Woodbridge, Virginia, to Fredericksburg, Virginia, before the 2020 season, and moved to Low-A play in the 2021 season.

Former affiliates

Nationals Dream Foundation
The Washington Nationals Dream Foundation is the team's charity which is "committed to community partnerships that improve the lives of children and families across the Washington Capital Region." The foundation opened a youth baseball academy in partnership with the D.C. government, and a pediatric diabetes care center at Children's National Medical Center in partnership with the Center. The foundation also provides grants to local organizations.

On August 1, 2011, the foundation, in partnership with several local organizations, formally opened Miracle Field in Germantown, Maryland, as part of an effort to encourage athletic activity in children with "mental and/or physical challenges." According to Steven Miller of MLB.com, what sets Miracle Field apart in terms of safety is its unique design, as it "is made entirely of a cushioned synthetic turf that is five-eighths of an inch thick—providing a safe surface for children in wheelchairs or with other handicaps."

Radio and television

The Nationals' flagship radio station is WJFK-FM (106.7 FM) "The Fan", which is owned by Entercom. Charlie Slowes and Dave Jageler are the play-by-play announcers. WJFK fronts a radio network of 19  stations serving portions of Virginia, Maryland, West Virginia, North Carolina, and Delaware as well as the District.

WFED (1500 AM) had been the flagship station since the 2006 season until a multi-year agreement was reached between the Nationals and WJFK before the 2011 season. WFED remains on the network as an affiliate; its 50 kilowatt clear-channel signal allows the Nationals' home-team call to be heard up and down the East Coast.

WWZZ (104.1 FM), which carried games in the 2005 season, was the team's first flagship radio station.

Mid-Atlantic Sports Network (MASN) televises all games not picked up by one of MLB's national television partners. Bob Carpenter has been the TV play-by-play announcer since 2006 and F.P. Santangelo was hired in January 2011 as color analyst. Mel Proctor was the TV play-by-announcer in 2005, and former color analysts are Ron Darling (2005), Tom Paciorek (2006), Don Sutton (2007–2008), and Rob Dibble, who took over the job in 2009 and was fired in September 2010 after criticizing Stephen Strasburg for not pitching while injured. Ray Knight filled in as color analyst in September 2010 after Dibble was fired.

Previously, WDCA (channel 20) carried 76 games in the 2005 season while the newly founded MASN was still negotiating cable carriage. From 2009 through 2017, MASN syndicated a package of 20 games for simulcast on an over-the-air television station in Washington. Broadcast partners under this arrangement were WDCW (channel 50) from 2009 through 2012 and CBS affiliate WUSA (channel 9) from 2013 through 2017. MASN did not continue the syndication deal for the 2018 season.

In the midst of a season in which they finished with the worst record in Major League Baseball, the Nationals' television ratings were among the worst in the National League in July 2008 but increased during the 2010 and 2011 seasons. Since 2012, when they began to achieve consistent success on the field, their television viewership has grown continually and dramatically. By 2016, the Nationals′ prime-time television ratings were 15th highest among the 29 U.S. MLB teams, and they rose to 12th in 2017. Ratings declined to 18th among the 29 U.S. teams for the 2018 season.

Broadcasters

 Charlie Slowes – radio (2005–present)
 Dave Shea – radio (2005)
 Dave Jageler – radio (2006–present)
 Mel Proctor – TV (2005)
 Ron Darling – TV (2005)
 Bob Carpenter – TV (2006–present)
 Tom Paciorek – TV (2006)
 Don Sutton – TV (2007–2008)
 Rob Dibble – TV (2009–2010)
 F. P. Santangelo – TV (2011–2021)
 Kevin Frandsen – TV (2022–present)

Rivalry

The Nationals have an inter-league rivalry with the nearby Baltimore Orioles, which is nicknamed the Beltway Series. The teams have played two series a season – one in Baltimore and one in Washington – since 2006. The Nationals and Orioles rivalry is one of the few that can be played in a World Series.

Notes

References

External links

 
 FOX Sports – Washington Nationals team front
 Sandalow, Marc. "A Brand-New Ballgame: The New Stadium of the Nationals", Washingtonian, March 1, 2008.

 
2005 establishments in Washington, D.C.
Grapefruit League
Major League Baseball teams
Privately held companies based in Washington, D.C.
Baseball teams established in 2005